This is a list of instruments by Hornbostel-Sachs number, covering those instruments that are classified under 312.11 under that system. These instruments are idiochord tube zithers.

These instruments may be classified with a suffix, based on how the strings are caused to vibrate.

4: Hammers or beaters
5: Bare hands and fingers
6: Plectrum
7: Bowing
71: Using a bow
72: Using a wheel
73: Using a ribbon
8: Keyboard
9: Using a mechanical drive

List

References

Notes

312.22